Architect amidst the Ruins (other versions:  - 'The Architect of the Ruins',  - 'To the Architect of the Ruins') was an open letter by Gennady Zyuganov, then a relatively little known party functionary (later leader of the Communist Party of the Russian Federation) to Alexander Yakovlev, the ideological founder of perestroika, who was also known as the "architect of perestroika". The letter was published in the hardline communist newspaper Sovetskaya Rossiya on 7 May 1991. The letter argued that perestroika caused disintegration of the state, that democratization resulted in a "war of legislation", glasnost turned out to be a weapon in the psychological war against the Soviet people, and that a new alliance of obscurantists, lumpen intelligentsia, and criminals was coming into being.

The letter was perceived as the start of the campaign to overthrow Mikhail Gorbachev.  It was later reported by Oleg Shenin that the text itself had been written by a KGB team, and Zyuganov's signature just suited the goals.

References

External links
Text of the original

1991 documents
1991 in the Soviet Union
Gennady Zyuganov
Open letters
Politics of Russia
Soviet internal politics